Squads for the Football at the 1962 Asian Games played in Tokyo, Japan.

Group A

Head coach:  Antun Pogačnik

Head coach:

Head coach:  Fernando Giménez Álvarez

Head coach:

Group B

Head coach:

Head coach:  Hidetoki Takahashi

Head coach:  Syed Abdul Rahim

Head coach:  Min Byung-dae

References

External links
https://web.archive.org/web/20140102194024/http://rdfc.com.ne.kr/int/skor-intres-1960.html

https://www.facebook.com/PhilippineFootballExpertHistorian/photos/gm.718355135420320/350092202997615/

1962
Squads